Loran Ludowick Lewis (May 9, 1825 – March 8, 1916) was an American lawyer and politician from New York.

Life
Loran L. Lewis was born in Mentz, New York on May 9, 1825, the son of John C. Lewis and Delecta (Barbour) Lewis. He studied law in Auburn, was admitted to the bar in 1848, and commenced practice in Buffalo. On June 1, 1852, he married Charlotte E. Pierson, and they had four children.

He was a member of the New York State Senate (31st D.) from 1870 to 1873, sitting in the 93rd, 94th, 95th and 96th New York State Legislatures.

He was a justice of the New York Supreme Court (8th D.) from 1883 to 1895 when he reached the constitutional age limit. In 1901, he was appointed by the court, with Robert C. Titus, to defend Leon Czolgosz at his trial for the assassination of William McKinley, although because Czolgosz did not cooperate with his attorneys, the prosecution easily won the trial and Czolgosz was sentenced to death.

Lewis died from pneumonia at his home in Buffalo on March 8, 1916.

Temperance and physical culture advocate Diocletian Lewis (1823–1886) was his brother.

References

 The New York Civil List compiled by Franklin Benjamin Hough, Stephen C. Hutchins and Edgar Albert Werner (1870; pg. 444)
 Life Sketches of Executive Officers, and Members of the Legislature of the State of New York, Vol. III by H. H. Boone & Theodore P. Cook (1870; pg. 94f)

External links
 

1825 births
1916 deaths
Republican Party New York (state) state senators
Politicians from Auburn, New York
New York Supreme Court Justices
Politicians from Buffalo, New York
Deaths from pneumonia in New York (state)
Assassination of William McKinley
Lawyers from Buffalo, New York
19th-century American judges